
Year 331 (CCCXXXI) was a common year starting on Friday (link will display the full calendar) of the Julian calendar. At the time, it was known as the Year of the Consulship of Bassus and Ablabius (or, less frequently, year 1084 Ab urbe condita). The denomination 331 for this year has been used since the early medieval period, when the Anno Domini calendar era became the prevalent method in Europe for naming years.

Events 
 By place 
 Roman Empire 
 Emperor Constantine the Great vigorously promotes Christianity, confiscating the property and valuables of a number of pagan temples throughout the Roman Empire.
 Constantine I dedicates the Church of the Holy Apostles in Constantinople.  
 Constantine I promulgates a law against divorce.

 Asia 
 Gogugwon becomes ruler of the Korean kingdom of Goguryeo.

 By topic 
 Art and Science 
 Eusebius of Caesarea writes the Onomasticon.

 Religion 
 Fifty Bibles of Constantine commissioned for use in Constantinople.
 Gregory the Illuminator withdraws to a small sanctuary in the Daranali province (Armenia).

Births 
 Jovian, Roman consul and emperor (d. 364) 
 Julian the Apostate, Roman emperor (d. 363)
 Yao Chang, Chinese emperor of the Qiang state (d. 394) 
 Yao Xiang (or Jingguo), Chinese warlord (d. 357)

Deaths 
 Gregory the Illuminator, official head of the Armenian Apostolic Church
 Micheon of Goguryeo, Korean ruler of Goguryeo

References